Mozaffari is an Iranian newspaper in Fars Province. The concessionaire of this magazine was Mirza Aliagha Shirazi and it was published in Bushire since 1901.

See also
List of magazines and newspapers of Fars
List of newspapers in Iran

References

Newspapers published in Fars Province
Mass media in Fars Province
Newspapers published in Iran
Newspapers published in Qajar Iran